Arthur Davenport F.R.Ae.S (9 July 1891 – 31 August 1976) was a British aircraft engineer working for Westland Aircraft in Yeovil, Somerset.

When the Westland Aircraft Works was created by the Petter twins in 1915, Arthur was one of the first draughtsman to be recruited from Petter's Ltd. He was chief designer from 1919, working under the direction of Teddy Petter from May 1934 until 1944, when Petter left (to join English Electric) and Davenport became technical director. According to Harald Penrose, he was made the scapegoat for the late delivery of the Wyvern and headed into retirement in March 1952.

In the 1920s, when most aircraft were biplanes, Arthur was a strong proponent of the monoplane. Most of his monoplane designs were high-winged or parasol, culminating in the Lysander. During his career he was involved in the design of the following fixed-wing aircraft.

 Westland Limousine Chief draughtsman 
 Westland Wagtail Chief draughtsman/Designer
 Westland Weasel Chief draughtsman/Designer
 Westland Woodpigeon
 Westland Widgeon Chief designer
 Westland Wizard
 Westland Wapiti/Wallace
 Westland Interceptor
 Westland Wessex
 Westland PV.3
 Westland Wallace
 Westland PV.7
 Westland F.7/30
 Westland Lysander 
 Westland Whirlwind
 Westland Welkin 
 Westland Wyvern Technical director

In the early 1930s he worked with Juan de la Cierva to develop the Cierva C.29 and Cierva CL.20 autogyros. It was this interest in rotary winged aircraft that would lead Westland to manufacture Sikorsky helicopters in the early 1950s.

Patents

Notes

References 

 

English aerospace engineers
British aerospace engineers
1891 births
1976 deaths